Antheia was one of the Charites, or Graces, of Greek mythology and was the goddess of swamps and flowery wreaths. She is the daughter of Zeus and Eurynome. She was depicted in Athenian vase painting as one of the attendants of Aphrodite.

Her name Antheia is derived from the Ancient Greek word ἄνθος means "flower" or "blossom". Her symbols are gold colored items. She was known to the Romans as Anthea. Her center of worship was on the island of Crete. The name Antheia was also given to Hera and connected to the Horae, under which she had a temple at Argos. It was also an epithet of Aphrodite at Knossos. She was the goddess of vegetation, gardens, blossoms, especially worshipped in spring and near lowlands and marshlands, favorable to the growth of vegetation. She was also the goddess of human love. Her symbols are gold-colored items like honey and myrrh. 

Antheia is also the Greek name of Ancient Sozopolis in modern Bulgaria, and another Antheia was a village that was later adapted into Patras around 1000 BC.

See also 
 Anthousai
 Chloris

Notes 

Greek goddesses
Nature goddesses
Epithets of Aphrodite 
Epithets of Hera